Lake Vermillion Recreation Area is a South Dakota state recreation area in McCook County, South Dakota in the United States. The park is open for year-round recreation including camping, swimming, fishing, hiking and boating on Lake Vermillion.

See also
List of South Dakota state parks

References

External links
 Lake Vermillion Recreation Area - South Dakota Department of Game, Fish, and Parks

Protected areas of McCook County, South Dakota
Protected areas of South Dakota
State parks of South Dakota